Manchu Love is a 1929 American pre-Code MGM short silent historical fiction film short in two-color Technicolor. The film features a cast entirely of people of Asian descent and stars Sojinas Su Shun and Etta Lee as Empress Tzu Hsi. It was the ninth film produced as part of Metro-Goldwyn-Mayer's "Great Events" series.

Production
The film was shot at the Tec-Art Studio in Hollywood. Director Elmer Clifton was paid $1000.00 for his work on this film and Light of India, a later entry in the series. The art direction and color supervision by Natalie Kalmus drew significant praise despite the project having one of the lowest budgets in the "Great Events" series.

Preservation Status
This film has survived in its entirety. A complete print was preserved by the Cinema Arts Laboratory in 1993 and is held in the archives at the George Eastman House. It was screened as recently as 2015 at the Museum of Modern Art's Roy and Niuta Titus Theater for a presentation by authors James Layton and David Pierce.

References

External links 

The Silent Film Still Archive

1929 films
American silent short films
Cultural depictions of Empress Dowager Cixi
Films directed by Elmer Clifton
Films set in 19th-century Qing dynasty
Metro-Goldwyn-Mayer short films
Silent films in color
1920s American films